The 2019 Total 6 Hours of Spa-Francorchamps was an endurance sports car racing event held at the Circuit de Spa-Francorchamps, Stavelot, Belgium on 2–4 May 2019. Spa-Francorchamps served as the seventh race of the 2018–19 FIA World Endurance Championship, and was the eighth running of the event as part of the championship. The race was won by the #8 Toyota TS050 Hybrid.

Qualifying

Qualifying results
Pole position winners in each class are marked in bold.

 – Motoaki Ishikawa crashed the No. 70 MR Racing car in qualifying, resulting in the car being unable to set a qualifying time.

Race

Race result
The minimum number of laps for classification (70% of the overall winning car's race distance) was 114 laps. Class winners in bold.

Standings after the race

2018–2019 LMP World Endurance Drivers' Championship

2018–2019 LMP1 World Endurance Championship

 Note: Only the top five positions are included for the Drivers' Championship standings.

2018–2019 World Endurance GTE Drivers' Championship

2018–2019 World Endurance GTE Manufacturers' Championship

 Note: Only the top five positions are included for the Drivers' Championship standings.

References

Spa-Francorchamps
Spa-Francorchamps
6 Hours of Spa-Francorchamps
6 Hours of Spa-Francorchamps